Raymon "Jammer" Jamito (born September 1, 1990) is a Filipino professional basketball player for the Pampanga Giant Lanterns of the Maharlika Pilipinas Basketball League (MPBL).

Professional career

Barangay Ginebra San Miguel
Jamito was the 3rd pick of the regular round in the 2016 PBA Draft.

In 2017, Jamito was part of the Slam Dunk Contest during All-Star Week. The crowd expected him to jump over 6-foot-9 Japeth Aguilar. Instead, he side-stepped him and did a basic one-hand dunk, drawing laughs from the crowd. The stunt became viral, and was featured on the television show "The Starters." He also won a Governors' Cup title that year.

Meralco Bolts
In 2018, Ginebra made him an unrestricted free agent, allowing the Bolts to pick him up. He had his best game with 8 points, 4 rebounds, and one block in a loss to the Phoenix Fuel Masters.

In 2021, he was given a contract extension. He was not given another extension after that season and did not return for the 2022–23 PBA season.

San Juan Knights 
Jamito then played for the San Juan Knights in the MPBL. He debuted with 14 points and seven rebounds in a win over the Valenzuela XUR Homes Realty Inc.

PBA career statistics

As of the end of 2021 season

Season-by-season averages

|-
| align=left | 
| align=left | Barangay Ginebra
| 10 || 3.4 || .471 || – || – || 1.4 || .4 || .1 || .1 || 1.6
|-
| align=left | 
| align=left | Barangay Ginebra / Meralco
| 12 || 6.6 || .400 || .000 || .333 || 1.8 || .2 || –|| .2 || 1.8
|-
| align=left | 
| align=left rowspan="3" | Meralco
| 14 || 2.3 || .727 || – || .667 || .6 || .1 || – || .1 || 1.3
|-
| align=left | 
| 16 || 9.5 || .481 || .000 || .636 || 2.7 || .3 || .1 || .1 || 3.6
|-
| align=left | 
| 10 || 4.5 || .421 || – || .667 || 2.5 || .1 || – || .4 || 1.8
|-class=sortbottom
| align="center" colspan=2 | Career
| 62 || 5.5 || .476 || .000 || .565 || 1.8 || .2 || .0 || .1 || 2.1

Personal life
Jamito is also known for his vlogs on YouTube, with around 20k subscribers.

References

External links
PBA.ph profile

1990 births
Living people
Barangay Ginebra San Miguel draft picks
Barangay Ginebra San Miguel players
Basketball players from Camarines Norte
Filipino men's 3x3 basketball players
Filipino men's basketball players
Maharlika Pilipinas Basketball League players
Meralco Bolts players
PBA 3x3 players
Power forwards (basketball)